Rhochmopterum is a genus of tephritid  or fruit flies in the family Tephritidae.

Species
Rhochmopterum antineura (Munro, 1935)
Rhochmopterum arcoides Munro, 1935
Rhochmopterum centrale (Hendel, 1915)
Rhochmopterum hirsutum Séguy, 1933
Rhochmopterum majus Bezzi, 1926
Rhochmopterum melanurum (Bezzi, 1926)
Rhochmopterum munroi Bezzi, 1924
Rhochmopterum neuropteripenne Speiser, 1910
Rhochmopterum parva (Hardy, 1974)
Rhochmopterum pygmaeum Munro, 1935
Rhochmopterum seniorwhitei (Bezzi, 1926)
Rhochmopterum tribullosum (Hering, 1940)
Rhochmopterum venustum (Meijere, 1914)

References

Tephritinae
Tephritidae genera
Diptera of Africa
Diptera of Asia
Diptera of Australasia